Sominassé is a town in northeastern Ivory Coast. It is a sub-prefecture of Nassian Department in Bounkani Region, Zanzan District.

Sominassé was a commune until March 2012, when it became one of 1126 communes nationwide that were abolished.

In 2014, the population of the sub-prefecture of Sominassé was 6,326.

Villages
The eight villages of the sub-prefecture of Sominassé and their population in 2014 are:

Notes

Sub-prefectures of Bounkani
Former communes of Ivory Coast